Vladislavić is a surname. Notable people with the surname include:

Frane Vladislavić (born 1994), Croatian footballer
Ivan Vladislavic (born 1957), South African writer
Robert Vladislavić (born 1968), Croatian footballer

See also
 Vladislav

Croatian surnames